Natun Asom Gana Parishad ('New Assamese People's Association') was a political party in the Indian state of Assam. NAGP was formed through a split of Asom Gana Parishad (AGP).

NAGP was led by former Union Law Minister and MP Dinesh Goswami and former Assam Home Minister Bhrigu Kumar Phukan. Goswami and Phukan had been prominent leaders of the Assam Agitation led by All Assam Students Union and All Assam Gana Sangram Parishad in the early 1980s. Other prominent leaders of the party included former Assam Education Minister Brindaban Goswami and former Assam Legislative Assembly speaker Pulakesh Barua.

In 1994, NAGP merged with AGP with Bhrigu Phukan as the Working President of the Asom Gana Parishad. Phukan was later removed from the post of party Working President and was finally expelled from AGP in 1997 following differences with party president and the then Chief Minister of Assam Prafulla Kumar Mahanta.  Another leader of NAGP, former state Education minister Brindaban Goswami later on became the president of AGP.

References

Defunct political parties in Assam
Asom Gana Parishad
Political parties in Assam
Political parties established in 1991
1991 establishments in Assam